Agustín Mestres (5 February 1923 – 28 July 1999) was a Spanish water polo player. He competed at the 1948 Summer Olympics and the 1952 Summer Olympics.

References

External links
 

1923 births
1999 deaths
Spanish male water polo players
Olympic water polo players of Spain
Water polo players at the 1948 Summer Olympics
Water polo players at the 1952 Summer Olympics
Place of birth missing
20th-century Spanish people